This is a list of elections in Canada in 2014. Included are provincial, municipal and federal elections, by-elections on any level, referendums and party leadership races at any level.

January to April
January 8 - Municipal by-election in Lloydminster (Alberta/Saskatchewan)
January 28 - Provincial by-elections in Arthur-Virden and Morris, Manitoba
February 10 - Territorial by-election in Rankin Inlet South, Nunavut
February 13 - Provincial by-elections in Niagara Falls and Thornhill, Ontario
April 7 - 2014 Quebec general election
April 9 - Provincial by-election in Virginia Waters, Newfoundland and Labrador
April 12
Kitimat Enbridge Northern Gateway Project plebiscite, 2014 - non binding municipal plebiscite in Kitimat, British Columbia
British Columbia Conservative Party leadership election, 2014
April 14 - Morinville, Alberta plebiscite
April 16 - Municipal by-election in North Battleford, Saskatchewan

May to August
May 4 - 2014 British Columbia New Democratic Party leadership election
May 6 - Nunatsiavut general election, 2014  
May 12 
First municipal election in the new Regional Municipality of Grand Tracadie–Sheila, New Brunswick
Municipal by-election in Lethbridge, Alberta
June 12 - 2014 Ontario general election
June 14 - 2014 Bloc Québécois leadership election
June 15 - Mayoral and municipal by-elections in Oka, Quebec
June 30 - Federal by-elections in Fort McMurray—Athabasca, Alberta, Macleod, Alberta, Scarborough—Agincourt, Ontario, and Trinity—Spadina, Ontario
July 13 - Municipal by-election in Deux-Montagnes, Quebec
July 21 - Mayoral by-election in Lac La Biche County, Alberta
July 25 - Municipal elections in Winnipeg Beach, Dunnottar, and Victoria Beach, Manitoba
August 2 - Municipal by-election in Norris Beach, Alberta
August 8 - Saskatchewan Liberal Party leadership election, 2014
August 26 - Provincial by-election in St. George's-Stephenville East, Newfoundland and Labrador

September to October
September 6 - 2014 Progressive Conservative Association of Alberta leadership election
September 13 - 2014 Progressive Conservative Party of Newfoundland and Labrador leadership election
September 21 - Municipal by-elections in Shawville, Quebec, Donnacona, Quebec and Brownsburg-Chatham, Quebec
September 22 - 2014 New Brunswick general election
September 23 - Municipal by-election in Pasadena, Newfoundland and Labrador
September 30 - Municipal by-election in Wabush, Newfoundland and Labrador
October 5 - Municipal by-elections in Wentworth, Quebec and Chambly, Quebec
October 6 - Cardston, Alberta plebiscite
October 18 - 2014 Alberta New Democratic Party leadership election
October 20 - Provincial by-election in Lévis, Quebec
October 22 - 2014 Manitoba municipal elections
October 27
2014 Ontario municipal elections
Provincial by-elections in Calgary-Elbow, Calgary-Foothills, Calgary-West and Edmonton-Whitemud, Alberta
October 29  Saskatoon, Saskatchewan separate school board by-election

November to December
November 2 
2014 Quebec school board elections 
Municipal by-election in l'Île-Perrot, Quebec
November 3 - 2014 Prince Edward Island municipal elections (cities, Cornwall, & Stratford)
November 5 
Saskatchewan municipal elections, 2014 (odd-numbered rural municipalities)
Provincial by-election in Conception Bay South, Newfoundland and Labrador
November 9 - Mayoral and municipal by-elections in Sainte-Martine, Quebec
November 13 - Provincial by-election in Lloydminster, Saskatchewan
November 15 - 2014 British Columbia municipal elections
November 16 - Mayoral and municipal by-elections in La Prairie, Quebec
November 17
Federal by-elections in Whitby—Oshawa, Ontario, and Yellowhead, Alberta
Provincial by-election in Saint John East, New Brunswick
November 25 - Provincial by-elections in Trinity-Bay de Verde and Humber East, Newfoundland and Labrador 
December 1 - Nunavut municipal elections, 2014 (hamlets)
December 8 
Northwest Territories municipal elections, 2014 (hamlets)
Municipal by-elections in 24 New Brunswick municipalities including mayoral by-elections in Beaubassin East, Le Goulet, Pointe-Verte and Shippagan.
December 14 - Municipal by-election in Saint-Joseph-du-Lac, Quebec
December 12–15 - Mayoral by-election in Russell, Ontario (postponed from municipal elections due to the death of a candidate)

See also
Municipal elections in Canada
Elections in Canada

References 

 
Political timelines of the 2010s by year